A protein supplement may be a dietary supplement or a bodybuilding supplement, and may take the form of a protein bar or protein powder.

Effects

Metabolism 
In untrained individuals, changes in lean body mass and muscle strength during the initial weeks of strength training are not influenced by the protein supplementation.  However whey-protein supplementation in overweight individuals may reduce the body weight, total fat mass and risk factors for cardiovascular diseases.

Protein supplementation also promotes greater gains in lean body mass and muscle strength for trained individuals as the intensity, frequency, and duration of strength training increases. It increases the muscles' strength and size, during prolonged strength training in healthy adults. However, ageing reduces this effect, whereas increased training experiences attempt to balance the ageing's negative effect. Besides, greater intakes in protein supplements than around 1.6 g/kg/day, do not further improve to gains in fat free mass. Finally, there is no evidence about an optimal timing for protein-supplement intakes, despite the widely held belief that pre- or post-workout protein supplementation would be more effective.

Chronic kidney disease 
Nutritional status can be altered in people living with chronic kidney disease (CKD). There is moderate-certainty evidence that regular consumption of oral protein-based nutritional supplements may increase serum albumin, a protein that can be lower in people with CKD, due to increased loss in urine and malnutrition. Improvements in albumin following protein supplementation may be greater in those who require hemodialysis or who are malnourished. Pre-albumin levels and mid-arm circumference measurements may also be increased following supplementation, though the certainty of evidence is low. Although these indicate possible improvements in nutritional status, it is unclear whether protein supplements affect quality of life, life expectancy, inflammation or body composition.

See also 
 Protein

References 

Dietary supplements
Muscular system